Harry Wright Wallace (11 September 1885 – 30 April 1973) was a British Labour Party politician.

He was Assistant Secretary of the Union of Post Office Workers.

At the 1924 general election, he was unsuccessful Labour candidate at Bury in Lancashire.

At the 1929 general election, he was elected as Member of Parliament (MP) for Walthamstow East. He lost the seat two years later, as Labour's vote collapsed in the 1931 election when party split over its leader Ramsay MacDonald's formation of a National Government.

Wallace regained his seat in the Labour landslide at the 1945 general election, and held the seat until his defeat at the 1955 general election by the Conservative John Harvey.

Mayor of the Metropolitan Borough of Lambeth 1952-53 .

References
UK General Elections since 1832

External links 

1885 births
1973 deaths
Labour Party (UK) MPs for English constituencies
UK MPs 1929–1931
UK MPs 1945–1950
UK MPs 1950–1951
UK MPs 1951–1955
Union of Communication Workers-sponsored MPs